Kathryn Jean Del Fava (born July 23, 1998) is an American professional soccer player who plays as a defender for Kansas City Current in the National Women's Soccer League (NWSL).

Club career

Utah Royals FC, 2020
Del Fava made her professional debut in the 2020 NWSL Challenge Cup on June 30, 2020.

Kansas City Current
On October 16, 2022 Del Fava scored the winning goal in the 10th minute of overtime in a playoff match against the Houston Dash. It was the latest goal in NWSL history and the first goal of Del Fava's NWSL career.

Personal life
Del Fava is a native of Kenosha, Wisconsin, and attended St. Joseph Catholic Academy.

References

External links

1998 births
Living people
American women's soccer players
Soccer players from Wisconsin
Sportspeople from Kenosha, Wisconsin
Women's association football midfielders
Illinois State Redbirds women's soccer players
Utah Royals FC draft picks
Utah Royals FC players
National Women's Soccer League players
Kansas City Current players